Greece competed with 21 athletes (7 men and 14 women) at the 2009 World Championships in Athletics, 15–23 August 2009 in Berlin, Germany. The team won no medals.

Team selection

Results

Men
Track and road events

Field events

Women
Track and road events

Field events

Combined events

See also
Greece at the IAAF World Championships in Athletics

References

External links
Official competition website

Nations at the 2009 World Championships in Athletics
World Championships in Athletics
Greece at the World Championships in Athletics